is a town in Kamikawa Subprefecture, Hokkaido, Japan. , the town had an estimated population of 4,609 and a density of 6.9 persons per km2.

Geography

Bifuka is located in a valley in the north central region of the island of Hokkaido. The town is surrounded by mountains. The Teshio River flows roughly northwest through Bifuka.

Neighboring municipalities

Bifuka borders six other municipalities, which span Kamikawa, Okhotsk, and Sōya subprefectures:
Kamikawa Subprefecture
Nayoro
Otoineppu
Nakagawa
Horokanai
Okhotsk Subprefecture
Ōmu
Sōya Subprefecture
Esashi

Climate

Education

Hokkaido Bifuka High School is located in the town.

Museum

Bifuka is home to the Bifuka Sturgeon Museum, a small facility which maintains eight species of sturgeon. Sturgeon were found in the Teshio River as far as Bifuka until the Meiji Period.

Transportation

The town is linked with Route 40 linking Wakkanai and southern Hokkaido. Another route the Route 275 is also connected.

Culture

Mascots

They are pumpkins who are best friends. Both wear hats made of birch trees. However, Bifuka-kun is a green pumpkin who wears a tie that resembled a sturgeon while Mimi-chan is an orange pumpkin who carries a bag that resembled a sturgeon.

References

External links

Official Website 

Towns in Hokkaido